Stephen Allan Hertz (born February 26, 1945) is a former Major League Baseball player. He was also manager of the Tel Aviv Lightning in the Israel Baseball League. He attended the University of Miami in Coral Gables, Florida, and is Jewish.

Major League Baseball 
Hertz made his major league debut in 1964 with the Houston Colt .45s and played in five games.

Israel Baseball League
In 2007, Hertz was manager of the Tel Aviv Lightning in the lone season of the Israel Baseball League.  The Lightning finished the regular season in second place with a 26-14 (.650) record, and lost to the Modi'in Miracle in the playoff semifinals.

High school and college coach
Hertz coached baseball teams at Coral Park High School, South Ridge High School, and Miami Dade-Wolfson Community College.

Halls of fame
In 1985, Hertz was inducted into the Miami High School Hall of Fame. In 2006, he was inducted into the Florida Community College Activities Association Hall of Fame.

References

Further reading
 This chapter in Ruttman's  history, based on a June 24, 2007 interview with Hertz conducted for the book, discusses Hertz's American, Jewish, baseball, and life experiences from youth to the present.

External links

Baseball Cube stats
Fangraphs stats
Baseball Almanac bio
Miami Dade bio
Jewish Major Leaguers baseball card
"Miami Dade College Coaches to be inducted into the Florida Community College Activities Association Hall of Fame", 10/10/06

1945 births
Living people
Baseball players from Miami
Baseball players from Ohio
Cocoa Astros players
Dubuque Packers players
Durham Bulls players
High Point-Thomasville Hi-Toms players
Houston Astros players
Israel Baseball League managers
Jewish American baseball managers
Jewish American baseball players
Jewish Major League Baseball players
Major League Baseball third basemen
Miami Dade Sharks baseball coaches
People from Butler County, Ohio
Pompano Beach Mets players
Salisbury Astros players
Sports coaches from Miami
Tidewater Tides players
Miami Senior High School alumni
21st-century American Jews